Say It with Babies is a 1926 American silent comedy film starring Glenn Tryon and featuring Oliver Hardy.

Cast
 Glenn Tryon - Casper Crum
 Vivien Oakland - Mrs. Crum
 Oliver Hardy - Hector, the floorwalker (as Babe Hardy)
 Martha Sleeper - His wife
 Jackie Hanes - The waif (as Jackie 'Husky' Hanes)
 Eva Novak
 Sammy Brooks
 Helen Gilmore

See also
 List of American films of 1926
 Oliver Hardy filmography

External links

1926 films
American silent short films
American black-and-white films
1926 short films
Films directed by Fred Guiol
Silent American comedy films
American comedy short films
1926 comedy films
1920s American films